The 2022 FIFA Club World Cup (officially known as the FIFA Club World Cup Morocco 2022 presented by Visit Saudi for sponsorship reasons) was the 19th edition of the FIFA Club World Cup, a FIFA-organised international club football tournament between the winners of the six continental confederations, as well as the host nation's league champions. The tournament was held from 1 to 11 February 2023 in Morocco.

Chelsea were the defending champions, but they were not able to defend their title as they did not qualify after being eliminated in the quarter-finals of the 2021–22 UEFA Champions League by eventual winners Real Madrid. The Spanish side went on to win the Club World Cup for a record fifth time, beating Al Ahly of Egypt 4–1 in the semi-finals before a 5–3 win over Saudi Arabian side Al-Hilal in the final.

Background and host appointment
While the Club World Cup was typically played annually in December, the 2022 tournament could not take place during this period due to the scheduling of the 2022 FIFA World Cup in November and December 2022. This, in conjunction with FIFA's planned future expansion of the Club World Cup, resulted in few public details on whether the 2022 tournament would take place. However, US$20 million was allocated for the Club World Cup in FIFA's 2023 budget. In December 2022, CONCACAF president Victor Montagliani implied the Club World Cup would take place in 2023, but would not be hosted by the United States. On 14 December, FIFA announced the host and tournament dates would be confirmed at the FIFA Council meeting in Doha, Qatar, on 16 December.

In May 2022, UOL Esporte reported that Japan were interested in hosting the tournament, having won hosting rights for the previous tournament before backing out due to the COVID-19 pandemic in Japan. UOL Esporte also reported in August that China were interested in holding the tournament, having originally been chosen to host an expanded Club World Cup in 2021 which was postponed due to scheduling issues caused by the COVID-19 pandemic. In September, Diario AS reported that the United States and the United Arab Emirates, hosts of the previous tournament, were also interested in staging the tournament. In December, Diario AS reported that Morocco, Qatar and the United Arab Emirates were the final contenders to host the tournament. On 16 December 2022, the FIFA Council appointed Morocco as the host for the tournament, and confirmed it would take place from 1 to 11 February 2023. Diario AS also reported that the final of the 2022 AFC Champions League, which had been pushed back to finish in May 2023 due to scheduling issues, would be moved forward to facilitate the scheduling of the 2022 FIFA Club World Cup. However, the AFC confirmed on 23 December 2022 that as the 2022 AFC Champions League would not be completed in time, Al-Hilal would be their representative at the 2022 FIFA Club World Cup as the reigning champions from the 2021 AFC Champions League.

Qualified teams

Notes

Venues
The matches were played at two venues, the Ibn Batouta Stadium in Tangier and the Prince Moulay Abdellah Stadium in Rabat.

Match officials
On 14 January 2023, FIFA announced that six referees, twelve assistant referees and eight video assistant referees were appointed for the tournament.

Squads

Each team named a 23-man squad (three of whom had to be goalkeepers). Injury replacements were allowed until 24 hours before the team's first match.

Matches
The draw of the tournament was held on 13 January 2023, 12:00 CET, at the Mohammed VI Football Academy in Salé, Morocco, to decide the matchups of the second round (between the first round winner and teams from AFC, CAF and CONCACAF), and the opponents of the two second round winners in the semi-finals (against teams from CONMEBOL and UEFA). In the second round draw, Wydad Casablanca and the winner of the first round match were pre-allocated to separate fixtures, with their opponents selected from the draw pot. The match kick-off times and venues were confirmed after the draw.

If a match was tied after normal playing time:
For elimination matches, extra time was played. If still tied after extra time, a penalty shoot-out was held to determine the winner.
For the match for third place, no extra time would be played, and a penalty shoot-out would be held to determine the winner.

All times are local, CET (UTC+1).

First round

Second round

Semi-finals

Match for third place
The match for third place, originally scheduled to be played at Prince Moulay Abdellah Stadium, Rabat, was moved on 9 February 2023 to Ibn Batouta Stadium, Tangier, in order to preserve the pitch for the final.

Final

Goalscorers

Awards

The following awards were given at the conclusion of the tournament. Vinícius Júnior of Real Madrid won the Golden Ball award, sponsored by Adidas.

FIFA also named a man of the match for the best player in each game at the tournament.

Sponsorship
Presenting Partner

 Visit Saudi

FIFA Partners

 Adidas
 Wanda Group

Tournament Supporter

 Orange Morocco
 Betano
 OCP Group
 ONCF

Broadcasters

References

External links

 
2022
2022 in association football
2023 in association football
2022
2022–23 in Moroccan football
February 2023 sports events in Africa